True Defiance is Demon Hunter's sixth full-length album. It was released April 10, 2012. Production work for the album comes from regular Solid State and Tooth & Nail Producer Aaron Sprinkle while mixing was finished by Jason Suecof.

The album also returns to utilizing three different cover arts specific to each version of the album, much like what the band did with their third album The Triptych. It is also their first album since The Triptych not to feature any guest artists.

Background 

"This record is without a doubt our most aggressive. Every Demon Hunter record must be a step up from the last. I know that's a goal for every band, but it seldom works that way - especially today, especially in metal. It seems like most band's prime years are long behind them. I refuse to let that be the case for us. We've been extremely underwhelmed with metal for the last five years or so, and that's been the fuel to create this record. With an extreme over-saturation of false, fleeting, trend-hopping noise in today's metal scene, we had to make something we've been longing to hear. Something truly meaningful and artistic. Something our fans would love and something that will turn the heads of those who have ignored us for the past decade." (Ryan Clark, Main Vocalist on the band's direction with True Defiance.)

The deluxe edition comprises two bonus songs, a DVD featuring acoustic performances, interviews and in-depth song discussions, a five-inch metal "True Defiance" pendant in a custom holder, a 20-page large-format photo booklet, lyric cards for each of the songs with an illustration printed in metallic ink, a two-sided fold-out poster of album covers housed in a 7 x 7-inch box

Critical reception 

The album received mixed to positive reviews. The album was a commercial success reaching No. 36 on the Billboard 200, better than their previous album The World Is a Thorn, and No. 2 On the Top Christian Albums chart. James Christopher Monger from Allmusic gave the album 3 1/2 out of 5 stars saying "The sixth full-length outing from Demon Hunter dials up the religious themes to 11 while maintaining a dark and ominous luster that dutifully upholds heavy metal's core values of volume, aggression, and defiance. The aptly named True Defiance juggles elements of metalcore, emo, thrash, and groove metal, offering up nine tightly wound haymakers, one vaguely forgettable power ballad ('Tomorrow Never Comes'), and even a moody acoustic instrumental piece ('Means to an End')." Ryan Wasoba of Alternative Press gave the album 2 out of 5 stars stating, "It may be hard for some to get past Demon Hunter’s religious affiliation. They are openly Christian, which means they interpret song titles such as 'Crucifix' and 'God Forsaken' more literal than the average metal band."

Track listing 

Standard Edition Track listing Reference 
Deluxe Edition Track listing Reference

Personnel 

Demon Hunter
 Ryan Clark – lead vocals
 Patrick Judge – lead guitar, backing vocals
 Jeremiah Scott – rhythm guitar
 Jon Dunn – bass guitar
 Timothy "Yogi" Watts – drums, backing vocals

Production
 Aaron Sprinkle – producer
 Jeremiah Scott – producer
 Jason Suecof – mixing
Chris Carmichael — strings (Deluxe Edition)

Line-up reference:

References 

2012 albums
Demon Hunter albums
Solid State Records albums
Albums produced by Aaron Sprinkle